The Tongan Maritime Force is the naval arm of His Majesty's Armed Forces of Tonga.

History
The TDS was founded on 10 March 1973 by King Tāufaʻāhau Tupou IV, who also commissioned the first craft on that date. The first craft was VOEA Ngahau Koula (P101), followed by VOEA Ngahau Siliva (P102) - the names mean Golden Arrow and Silver Arrow respectively. They were crewed by volunteers, but are no longer in service.

Royal Yacht  
 Titilupe , Touliki Base,

Patrol Boat Flotilla  
The Pacific-class patrol craft were provided to Tonga by Australia as part of the Pacific Patrol Boat Program. The TDS' main base is Touliki Base, in Nuku'alofa. , it has two Patrol vessels:

Logistic Support Flotilla

Marine Battalion
The Royal Tongan Marines is a  single Battalion with a HQ and Support Company  and 3 Light Infantry Companies, based at Fuaʻamotu.

Maritime Aviation
Maritime Aviation Wing based at Fuaʻamotu International Airport.

References

Military of Tonga
Navies by country
1973 establishments in Tonga